Robbins Hebrew Academy (RHA), formerly known as United Synagogue Day School, is a private elementary (Nursery to Grade 5) and middle school (Grade 6 to Grade 8) Jewish day school in Toronto, Ontario.

Founded in 1957 as the Foundation Day School at the Beth Tzedec Synagogue, it was renamed United Synagogue Day School in 1961. In 2010, after an endowment, the school changed its name to Robbins Hebrew Academy, as a condition to accepting the endowment, by Larry Robbins. It was the first Jewish Day School in Toronto to be CAIS (www.cais.ca) accredited.

Notable alumni
 Zach Hyman (born 1992), professional hockey player on the Edmonton Oilers and award-winning author

References

External links
 United Synagogue Day School

Conservative Jewish day schools
Conservative Judaism in Canada
Jewish schools in Canada
Educational institutions established in 1957
Elementary schools in Toronto
Middle schools in Toronto
Private schools in Toronto
1957 establishments in Ontario